Justin Grove (born November 7, 1988) is an American professional soccer player who plays as a midfielder.

References

External links
 

Living people
1988 births
American soccer players
American expatriate soccer players
American expatriate sportspeople in France
American expatriate sportspeople in South Africa
Association football midfielders
Championnat National players
Expatriate footballers in France
Expatriate soccer players in South Africa
Fredericksburg Gunners players
National Premier Soccer League players
Red Star F.C. players
Richmond Kickers players
Richmond Spiders men's soccer players
Soccer players from Richmond, Virginia
Sportspeople from Richmond, Virginia
USL League One players
USL League Two players
University of Paris alumni